Antonio Mancinelli (6 December 1452 – 1505) was a humanist pedagogue, grammarian, and rhetorician from Velletri who taught in Venice, Rome, and Orvieto. He produced editions of Cicero, Herodotus, Horace, Juvenal, Suetonius, Virgil, and many other authors. His Carmen de Figuris rendered parts of Quintilian's rhetoric in hexameter.

By 1473, he had opened a humanistic school in Velletri.  He died in Rome.

Notes

Bibliography

 M.E. Cosenza, Biographical and Bibliographical Dictionary of the Italian Humanists..., Boston, 1962. (not seen)

1452 births
1505 deaths
People from Velletri
Italian Renaissance humanists
Italian rhetoricians